Marlbrook may refer to:

in England
Marlbrook, Herefordshire, England
Marlbrook, Shropshire, England
Marlbrook, Worcestershire, England

in the United States
Marlbrook, Virginia, a community
Marlbrook (Glasgow, Virginia), listed on the National Register of Historic Places in Rockbridge County, Virginia